"This Is My Time" is a song by German singer Sasha.

Music video
The music video for the song was filmed at the Westfalenstadion in Dortmund. Professional footballers Sebastian Kehl and Christoph Metzelder appear in the clip. It was premiered on 19 May 2002 on German television broadcasting station Sat.1.

Formats and track listings

Charts

Weekly charts

References

External links 
 

2000 singles
2000 songs
Sasha (German singer) songs